Sarah Elizabeth Reeves; born April 29, 1989) is an American musician and singer who primarily plays a Christian pop and worship style of music. She has released five extended plays and three studio albums (two of which are independently released).

Early and personal life
Reeves was born Sarah Elizabeth Reeves on April 29, 1989, in Athens, Alabama. She is the daughter of John Mark "Hershey" Reeves and Tina Key Reeves, and has two younger sisters and an older brother.  One of her younger sisters, Mary Reeves, is in the band Only in Stories. Her father is a music producer and songwriter who helped to establish Sound Cell Studios in Huntsville, Alabama, where Sarah recorded her first album. Reeves was given the call from God to become a worship leader at 15 years-old.  She is married to Philip Kothlow, and the couple reside in Nashville, Tennessee together.

Music career
Reeves' music career started in 2006 with her first major-label release, Sweet Sweet Sound, an extended play that was released on April 21, 2009, from Sparrow Records. This extended play was her breakthrough release upon the Billboard magazine charts, placing No. 19 on the Christian Albums chart and No. 9 on the Heatseekers Albums. The song "Sweet Sweet Sound" peaked at No. 27 on the Christian Songs chart and at No. 24 on the Christian AC Songs chart. Her subsequent extended play, God of the Impossible, was released on April 20, 2010, with Sparrow Records. The first studio album, Broken Things, was released on July 26, 2011. She released Christmas, a independently-made extended play, in 2013. Her second studio album, Acoustic Worship Covers, Vol. 1, was released on March 24, 2014. On May 14, 2021, the Belonging Co released "Eyes on You" featuring Sarah Reeves as the second promotional single from See the Light.

Discography

Studio albums

Extended plays

Singles

References

External links
 
 New Release Today profile
 All About Worship interview

1989 births
Living people
American performers of Christian music
Musicians from Alabama
Musicians from Tennessee
Songwriters from Alabama
Songwriters from Tennessee
Sparrow Records artists